Iulota phauloptila is a moth of the family Gelechiidae. It was described by Turner in 1919. It is found in Australia, where it has been recorded from New South Wales.

The wingspan is 11–14 mm. The forewings are whitish with scanty pale fuscous irroration and with the discal dots obsolete. The hindwings are whitish.

References

Moths described in 1919
Iulota